Tuğçe Özbudak (born 10 July 1982) Turkish actress.

Filmography

References

External links 
 
 
 

1982 births
Living people
Bilkent University alumni
Actresses from Ankara
21st-century Turkish actresses
Turkish film actresses